Adrian Gheorghe Iordache (born 12 September 1980) is a Romanian football coach and a former player. He is an assistant coach with Voluntari. He played as a defender. His former teams include: AEL Limassol, Dinamo București, Poiana Câmpina, Oțelul Galați, Shinnik Yaroslavl, Argeș Pitești, Alki Larnaca and Rapid București, among others.

Honours

Club 
Dinamo București
Divizia A : 1999–00, 2003–2004
Cupa României : 2003–04, 2004–05

AEL Limassol
Cypriot Cup runner-up : 2008–09

Khazar Lankaran
Azerbaijan Cup : 2010–11

External links

 
 

1980 births
Living people
Sportspeople from Pitești
Romanian footballers
Association football defenders
Liga I players
Liga II players
FC Dinamo București players
FCM Câmpina players
ASC Oțelul Galați players
FC Argeș Pitești players
FC Rapid București players
CS Mioveni players
ACF Gloria Bistrița players
Russian Premier League players
FC Shinnik Yaroslavl players
Cypriot First Division players
Alki Larnaca FC players
AEL Limassol players
Azerbaijan Premier League players
Khazar Lankaran FK players
Romanian expatriate footballers
Romanian expatriate sportspeople in Azerbaijan
Expatriate footballers in Azerbaijan
Romanian expatriate sportspeople in Cyprus
Expatriate footballers in Cyprus
Romanian expatriate sportspeople in Russia
Expatriate footballers in Russia
Romanian expatriate sportspeople in Saudi Arabia
Romanian expatriate sportspeople in Lebanon